Orla Venter (born 1 January 1976) is a Namibian female athlete. Venter competed at the 1993 World Championships in Athletics in the high jump She finished tied for 18th place with Megumi Sato of Japan

References

External links

1976 births
Living people
Namibian high jumpers
Female high jumpers
Namibian female athletes
World Athletics Championships athletes for Namibia
20th-century Namibian women